Bicyclus is a butterfly genus from the subfamily Satyrinae in the family Nymphalidae. The species are found in the Afrotropical realm.

Species
Bicyclus abnormis (Dudgeon, 1909)
Bicyclus albocincta (Rebel, 1914)
Bicyclus alboplaga (Rebel, 1914)
Bicyclus amieti Libert, 1996
Bicyclus analis (Aurivillius, 1895)
Bicyclus angulosa (Butler, 1868)
Bicyclus anisops (Karsch, 1892)
Bicyclus anynana (Butler, 1879)
Bicyclus auricruda (Butler, 1868)
Bicyclus aurivillii (Butler, [1896])
Bicyclus brakefieldi Brattstrom, 2012
Bicyclus buea (Strand, 1912)
Bicyclus campina (Aurivillius, 1901)
Bicyclus campus (Karsch, 1893)
Bicyclus condamini van Son, 1963
Bicyclus cooksoni (Druce, 1905)
Bicyclus cottrelli (van Son, 1952)
Bicyclus danckelmani (Rogenhofer, 1891)
Bicyclus dekeyseri (Condamin, 1958)
Bicyclus dentata (Sharpe, 1898)
Bicyclus dorothea (Cramer, [1779])
Bicyclus dubia (Aurivillius, 1893)
Bicyclus elishiae Brattstrom, 2015
Bicyclus ena (Hewitson, 1877)
Bicyclus ephorus Weymer, 1892
Bicyclus evadne (Cramer, [1779])
Bicyclus feae (Aurivillius, 1910)
Bicyclus funebris (Guérin-Méneville, 1844)
Bicyclus golo (Aurivillius, 1893)
Bicyclus graueri (Rebel, 1914)
Bicyclus heathi Brattstrom, 2015
Bicyclus hewitsonii (Doumet, 1861)
Bicyclus howarthi Condamin, 1963
Bicyclus hyperanthus (Bethune-Baker, 1908)
Bicyclus iccius (Hewitson, [1865])
Bicyclus ignobilis (Butler, 1870)
Bicyclus istaris (Plötz, 1880)
Bicyclus italus (Hewitson, 1865)
Bicyclus jefferyi Fox, 1963
Bicyclus kenia (Rogenhofer, 1891)
Bicyclus kiellandi Condamin, 1986
Bicyclus lamani (Aurivillius, 1900)
Bicyclus makomensis (Strand, 1913)
Bicyclus madetes (Hewitson, 1874)
Bicyclus maesseni Condamin, 1970
Bicyclus mahale Congdon, Kielland & Collins, 1998
Bicyclus mandanes (Hewitson, 1873)
Bicyclus martius (Fabricius, 1793)
Bicyclus matuta (Karsch, 1894)
Bicyclus medontias (Hewitson, [1872])
Bicyclus mesogena (Karsch, 1894)
Bicyclus milyas (Hewitson, 1864)
Bicyclus mollitia (Karsch, 1895)
Bicyclus moyses Condamin & Fox, 1964
Bicyclus nachtetis Condamin, 1965
Bicyclus neustetteri (Rebel, 1914)
Bicyclus nobilis (Aurivillius, 1893)
Bicyclus pareensis Collins & Kielland, 2008
Bicyclus pavonis (Butler, 1876)
Bicyclus persimilis (Joicey & Talbot, 1921)
Bicyclus procora (Karsch, 1893)
Bicyclus rhacotis (Hewitson, [1866])
Bicyclus rileyi Condamin, 1961
Bicyclus safitza (Westwood, [1850])
Bicyclus sambulos (Hewitson, [1877])
Bicyclus sandace (Hewitson, 1877)
Bicyclus sangmelinae Condamin, 1963
Bicyclus saussurei (Dewitz, 1879)
Bicyclus sciathis (Hewitson, [1866])
Bicyclus sealeae Collins & Larsen, 2008
Bicyclus sebetus (Hewitson, 1877)
Bicyclus sigiussidorum Brattstrom, 2015
Bicyclus similis Condamin, 1963
Bicyclus simulacris Kielland, 1990
Bicyclus smithi (Aurivillius, 1928)
Bicyclus sophrosyne (Plötz, 1880)
Bicyclus subtilisurae Brattstrom, 2015
Bicyclus suffusa (Riley, 1921)
Bicyclus sweadneri Fox, 1963
Bicyclus sylvicolus Condamin, 1961
Bicyclus taenias (Hewitson, 1877)
Bicyclus tanzanicus Condamin, 1986
Bicyclus technatis (Hewitson, 1877)
Bicyclus trilophus (Rebel, 1914)
Bicyclus uniformis (Bethune-Baker, 1908)
Bicyclus uzungwensis Kielland, 1990
Bicyclus vansoni Condamin, 1965
Bicyclus vulgaris (Butler, 1868)
Bicyclus xeneas (Hewitson, [1866])
Bicyclus xeneoides Condamin, 1961
Bicyclus zinebi (Butler, 1869)

External links 
"Bicyclus Kirby, 1871" at Markku Savela's Lepidoptera and Some Other Life Forms

Elymniini
Butterfly genera